Olga Bay is a small (11x4 km) mainly ice-free bay in the Sea of Japan on the east coast of Primorsky Krai.

In July 1856 Captain Charles Codrington Forsyth of  HMS Hornet named the bay "Port Michael Seymour" in honour of  Rear-Admiral Sir Michael Seymour, the commander-in-chief of the East Indies and China Station (in office: 1856-1859). In July 1857 Captain  of the Russian corvette  Amerika named this "new bay, not [...] marked on maps" as the "Bay of Saint Olga" after Saint Olga of Kiev. (The previous day Chikhachyov had visited the "Bay of Saint Vladimir" (now "Vladimir Bay") to the north-east of Olga Bay, naming it after Saint Olga's grandson  Saint Vladimir.)

The port town of Olga stands on the northern coast of the bay; the Avvakumovka River flows into the bay's western part.

The northern part of Olga Bay - Tihaya Pristan - is highly protected from winds and  waves.

See also
Olga Bay Larch

References

Bays of Primorsky Krai